Julio César Chávez González (born July 12, 1962), also known as Julio César Chávez Sr., is a Mexican former professional boxer who competed from 1980 to 2005. A multiple-time world champion in three weight divisions, Chávez was listed by The Ring magazine as the world's best boxer, pound for pound, from 1990 to 1993. During his career he held the WBC super featherweight title from 1984 to 1987, the WBA and WBC lightweight titles between 1987 and 1989, the WBC light welterweight title twice between 1989 and 1996, and the IBF light welterweight title from 1990 to 1991. He also held the Ring magazine and lineal lightweight titles from 1988 to 1989, and the lineal light welterweight title twice between 1990 and 1996. Chávez was named Fighter of the Year for 1987 and 1990 by the Boxing Writers Association of America and The Ring respectively.

Chávez holds records for the most total successful defenses of world titles (27, shared with Omar Narváez), most title fight victories and fighters beaten for the title (both at 31), and most title fights (37); he has the second most title defenses won by knockout (21, after Joe Louis with 23). His fight record was 89 wins, 0 losses, and 1 draw before his first professional loss to Frankie Randall in 1994, before which he had an 87-fight win streak until his draw with Pernell Whitaker in 1993. Chávez's 1993 win over Greg Haugen at the Estadio Azteca set the record for the largest attendance for an outdoor boxing match: 136,274.

He is ranked as the 17th best boxer of all time, pound for pound, by BoxRec, #24 on ESPN's list of "50 Greatest Boxers of All Time", and 18th on The Ring'''s "80 Best Fighters of the Last 80 Years". In 2010 he was inducted into the International Boxing Hall of Fame for the Class of 2011. He is the father of current boxers Omar Chávez and former WBC middleweight champion Julio César Chávez Jr.

Early life
Julio César Chávez was born on July 12, 1962, in Ciudad Obregón, Sonora, Mexico. His father, Rodolfo Chavez, worked for the railroad, and Julio grew up in an abandoned railroad car with his five sisters and four brothers. Chávez came from a poor family and became a boxer for money, he stated: "I saw my mom working, ironing, and washing people's clothes, and I promised her I would give her a house someday, and she would never have that job again." He began boxing as an amateur at the age of 16 and he then moved to Tijuana to pursue a professional career.

Professional career
Chávez made his professional debut at age 17. In his 12th fight, on March 4, 1980, Chávez faced Miguel Ruiz in Culiacán, Sinaloa. At the end of the first round, Chavez landed a blow that knocked Ruiz out. Delivered as the bell sounded, the blow was ruled a disqualification in the ring and Ruiz was declared the winner. The next day, however, his manager, Ramón Felix, consulted with the Mexican boxing commission, and after further review, the result was overturned and Chávez was declared the winner.

Super Featherweight
Chávez won his first championship, the vacant WBC Super Featherweight title, on September 13, 1984, by knocking out fellow Mexican Mario "Azabache" Martínez at the Grand Olympic Auditorium in Los Angeles. Martínez had been the betting favorite in the bout, due partly to his previous victory over former WBC world champion Rolando Navarette in a non-title bout. On April 19, 1985, Chávez defended his title against number one ranked contender Ruben Castillo (63-4-2) by knocking him out in the sixth round. On July 7, 1985, Chavez defeated former and future champion Roger Mayweather via a second-round knockout. On August 3, 1986, Chavez won a twelve-round majority decision over former WBA and future IBF Super Featherweight champion Rocky Lockridge in Monte Carlo. In his next bout, he defeated former champion Juan Laporte by a twelve-round unanimous decision. On March 18, 1987, he defeated number one ranked challenger Francisco Tomas Da Cruz (27-1-0) by third-round knockout. He successfully defended his WBC Super Featherweight title a total of nine times.

Lightweight
On November 21, 1987, Chávez moved up to the lightweight division and faced WBA Lightweight Champion Edwin Rosario. Prior to the bout, there were concerns about how Chávez would handle the move up in weight. Chávez commented, "Everything I've accomplished as champion, and the nine title defenses, would be thrown away with a loss to Rosario." The two fighters nearly exchanged blows during a press conference after Rosario threatened to send Chávez back to Mexico in a coffin. Chávez would ultimately give a career-defining performance as he defeated Rosario by an eleventh-round TKO to win the title. HBO Punchstat showed Rosario landing 263 of 731 punches thrown in the fight (36%) and Chavez 450 of 743 (61%). After the bout, Sports Illustrated ran the headline, "Time To Hail César: WBA Lightweight Champion César Chávez of Mexico may be the world's best fighter."

On April 16, 1988, Chávez defeated number one ranked contender Rodolfo Aguilar (20–0–1) by sixth-round technical knockout. On June 4, 1988, he won against former two-time champion Rafael Limón by scoring a seventh-round TKO. Later that year, he unified the WBA and WBC belts by a technical decision win over champion José Luis Ramírez. An accidental head-butt opened a cut on Ramírez's forehead and the doctor halted the fight, sending the decision to the judges' scorecards at that point in the fight. Chávez, ahead on all scorecards, was declared the winner. He was also awarded The Ring Lightweight title after the victory.
Chavez vacated his WBA and WBC Lightweight titles in order to move up to the super lightweight division.

Light Welterweight
In his next bout, he won the WBC Light Welterweight title by defeating Roger Mayweather for a second time. Mayweather did not come out of his corner after the tenth round, giving Chavez the TKO win. In 1989, Chávez defeated future champion Sammy Fuentes by tenth-round TKO. In his next bout, he handed Alberto de las Mercedes Cortes (44–0) his first career loss by scoring a third-round knockout.

 Chávez vs. Taylor 

On March 17, 1990, he faced Meldrick Taylor, the undefeated IBF Light Welterweight Champion, in a title unification fight. While Taylor carried the fight to Chavez through round 8, Julio rallied in the last four rounds. With about 30 seconds left in the 12th round, he landed a hard straight right hand on the chin of Taylor, which hurt him badly. Shortly thereafter, he knocked down the former Olympic gold medalist. Although Taylor rose at the referee's count of six, he failed to respond coherently to referee Richard Steele's questions after being issued a mandatory 8 count, and continued to hold onto the ropes in the corner, resulting in Steele stopping the fight with only two seconds remaining. Many boxing fans and members of the media were outraged that Steele would stop a match that Taylor was winning with only two seconds left, while others felt that Steele was justified in stopping the fight given Taylor's condition and the fact that he was unable to respond to Steele before the conclusion of the match. Steele defended his decision by saying that his concern is protecting a fighter, regardless of how much time is left in the round or the fight. As Steele put it, "I stopped it because Meldrick had took a lot of good shots, a lot of hard shots, and it was time for it to stop. You know, I'm not the timekeeper, and I don't care about the time. When I see a man that has had enough, I'm stopping the fight." The Ring named it the "Fight of the Year" for 1990 and later the "Fight of the Decade" for the 1990s. While many hoped for an immediate rematch, Taylor opted to move up in weight in his next bout and the fighters did not meet again until 1994, when Chávez dominated and knocked out a faded Taylor in eight rounds.

After unifying the titles, Chávez engaged in a busy series of title defenses and non-title fights. On December 8, 1990, he defeated the WBC mandatory challenger Kyung-Duk Ahn (29-1) by third-round knockout. On March 18, 1991, he defeated WBC number four ranked fighter John Duplessis (34-1) by fourth-round TKO. On September 14, 1991, Chávez won a twelve-round unanimous decision over former champion Lonnie Smith. On April 10, 1992, he scored a TKO victory over number-one ranked contender Angel Hernandez (37-0-2, 22 KOs) in the fifth round. Later that year, he defeated Frankie Mitchell (29-1) by fourth-round TKO.

Chávez vs. Camacho
On September 12, 1992, Chávez faced WBO Light Welterweight Champion Hector "Macho" Camacho (41-1-0, 18 KOs) in a highly anticipated bout. Chávez dominated Camacho en route to a unanimous decision win. The final scores were 117–111, 119-110 and 120-107 for Chávez. After the fight, on his arrival to Mexico, the President Carlos Salinas de Gortari sent the special car reserved for the Pope to take him from the airport to the President's house.

Chávez vs. Haugen
His 1993 fight with Greg Haugen featured trash talk from Haugen, who derided Chavez's 82-fight unbeaten streak as consisting mostly of "Tijuana taxi drivers that my mother could have knocked out" and insisting that "There aren't 130,000 Mexicans who can afford tickets" to see the fight in Estadio Azteca. Chávez responded by saying, "I really hate him bad. When he looks at me, I want to vomit. I am going to give him the worst beating of his life; I am going to make him swallow the words that came out of his dirty mouth." Ultimately, 136,274 showed up to set a world record for outdoor fight attendance as they watched Chávez drop Haugen quickly and then back off with the apparent intention of punishing him for his prefight remarks. However, the referee had seen enough by the fifth round and stopped it for a TKO victory for Chávez. After the fight, Chávez commented to Haugen, "Now you know I don't fight with taxi drivers," and a bloodied Haugen responded, "They must have been tough taxi drivers." Later that year, Chávez scored a sixth-round TKO victory over number one ranked contender Terrence Alli.

Draw with Whitaker and first career loss

After a division-record 18 consecutive defenses of his light welterweight title, Chávez (87–0) moved up one more weight division to challenge Pernell Whitaker (32–1) for his WBC Welterweight title in September 1993. Since the late 1980s, Chávez stated several times that he wanted a fight against Whitaker. The Whitaker team, among them Lou Duva, told The Ring that they did not want a fight against Chavez in those days. In the eyes of many experts, Whitaker waited for Chávez to age. The result of the fight was a controversial majority draw, allowing Chávez to remain undefeated with Whitaker retaining his title. Various members of the American media, including The Ring and Sports Illustrated, were critical of the decision. Sports Illustrated put Pernell Whitaker on the cover of its next magazine with a one word title, "Robbed!" Chávez stated after the fight: "I felt I was forcing the fight ... he just kept holding me too much, he was throwing too many low blows too." There was no rematch.

Chavez continued defending his Light Welterweight title and on December 18, 1993, he defeated British Commonwealth Light Welterweight Champion Andy Holligan (21–0–0) by fifth-round TKO. Chávez faced Frankie Randall on January 29, 1994, in a fight that most expected him to win easily. Instead, Randall knocked him down for the first time in his career and went on to win a split decision and Chávez lost the title to Randall. Chávez blamed his loss on referee Richard Steele, who deducted two points from Chávez for low blows, which affected the difference on the scorecards. The WBC ordered an immediate rematch and Chávez regained the title on a split technical decision in May 1994. The fight was fiercely contested when they collided heads, opening a large cut over Chávez's eyebrow in the seventh round. After the head cut, during round eight, the referee called for the doctor, who then stopped the fight. Under WBC rules, Randall lost one point, giving Chávez the technical victory. The two faced one another in a rubber match 10 years later, which Chávez won.

Chavez then faced Meldrick Taylor in a rematch, four years after their historic first fight. Chavez defeated him in the eighth round by a knockout that sent Taylor from one side of the ring to the other. In his next bout, Chavez defeated three-time champion Tony Lopez. In 1995, he defeated former and future Light Welterweight Champion Giovanni Parisi. Later that year, he defended his title against number one ranked challenger David Kamau, despite suffering a cut in the opening round. Prior to the bout, Chavez indicated that he was considering retirement: "I've had a lot of problems with my arms, with my knees. I really don't want to extend myself much longer", Chávez said. "After so many years of working out, it all builds up. I am not giving what I used to be able to give. I will fight De La Hoya for a lot of money, and then retire."

Chávez vs. De La Hoya
On June 7, 1996, Chávez faced Oscar De La Hoya. A large gash appeared over the left eye of Chávez within the first minute of the first round, leading many to assume what Chávez later confirmed—that the cut occurred earlier in training and was re-opened in the bout. Heavy blood flow prompted the doctor to stop the fight in the fourth round. Until their eventual rematch in 1998, Chávez would always state that De La Hoya had not defeated him, but that a gash that he had suffered in training was the real cause of the stoppage of the fight. In his next bout, Chávez defeated former champion Joey Gamache in his 100th career bout.

Chávez vs. González
An elbow injury to Chávez has forced postponement of his fight with González. The fight was scheduled for Oct 25th 1997.

A year after De La Hoya moved up to welterweight in 1997, Chávez fought Miguel Ángel González for the vacant WBC Light Welterweight title. That fight ended in a draw. In a rematch with De La Hoya for the WBC Welterweight belt in September 1998, De La Hoya won by 8th-round TKO. About De La Hoya, Chávez stated years after, "I have nothing against him, even though he beat me twice. I have no resentment towards him... De La Hoya was younger than me during our fight, and I was on my way out of boxing. If Oscar didn't fight me, he would not have been anything in boxing." Chavez spoke about his sparring session with De La Hoya six years before their first fight and stated: "I sparred with him and dropped him in the second round with a right hand. De la Hoya was a kid... that day after training he stayed and we went out to dinner, I gave him some $300-$400 from my pocket to help him out."

Retirement and farewell fights

Chavez won his first two bouts in 1999 before losing to then 32-year-old Willy Wise via 10 round unanimous decision. In 2000, at the age of 38, Chávez challenged Light Welterweight Champion Kostya Tszyu. Chavez lost the bout via 6th-round TKO. After a 2001 victory over Terry Thomas in Ciudad Juárez, Mexico, Chávez retired. However, on November 24, 2003, he came out of retirement to avenge his earlier loss to Willy Wise, knocking Wise out in two rounds in Tijuana, Mexico. In April 2004, Chávez went back into the ring, for what he again claimed would be his last appearance. In that fight, nicknamed Adiós, México, Gracias (Good-bye, Mexico, Thank you), he beat his former conqueror, Frankie Randall, by a ten-round decision. On May 28, 2005, Chávez once again stepped into a boxing ring, outpointing Ivan Robinson in ten rounds at the Staples Center (this fight was televised by Showtime Championship Boxing). On September 17, 2005, at the U.S. Airways Center in Phoenix, Arizona, Chávez suffered a TKO loss to until then little-known Grover Wiley in the 115th bout of his career, retiring in his corner before the start of the 5th round, after injuring his right hand. After the bout, Chávez told his promoter, Bob Arum, that this time he was definitely retiring from boxing. His defeat was avenged two years later by his son, Julio César Chávez, Jr., who knocked Wiley out in the third round of their fight.

Exhibition bouts
Chávez has fought multiple exhibition bouts for charitable causes.

On January 1, 1985, Chavez scored a third-round technical knockout over Manny Hernandez in an exhibition bout staged in Mexico City, Mexico to garner money for the victims of a 1984 gas explosion in Mexico. 

Late in 2014, Julio César Chávez returned to the ring for an exhibition with Vicente Sagrestano in a bout aimed at collecting toys for poor children.

He and former rival Mario Martinez, against whom he earned his first world championship in 1984, faced each other again on July 3, 2015, in an event to benefit Chavez's two drug rehabilitation clinics.

Personal life
During the late part of his career, Chávez struggled with drug addiction and alcohol abuse. He stated that he started drinking the night after his fight against Edwin Rosario. He later developed a cocaine habit. Chávez got into rehab several times until he recovered.

Chávez is the father of Omar Chávez and former WBC Middleweight Champion Julio César Chávez, Jr. He works as an analyst for ESPN and TV Azteca, and spends his time between Mexico and the United States, where he owns businesses and properties. He also has a daughter, Nicole Chavez, who is a participant on the Telemundo television reality show, La Casa de los Famosos. 

Chávez's brother, Rafael Chávez González, was murdered on Sunday, June 25, 2017, during a robbery at one of Rafael's businesses.

Career in review

Chávez won six world titles in three weight divisions: WBC Super Featherweight (1984), WBA Lightweight (1987), WBC Lightweight (1988), WBC Light Welterweight (1989), IBF Light Welterweight (1990) and WBC Light Welterweight (1994) for the second time. He was also awarded The Ring Lightweight Championship in 1988. World champions whom Chávez defeated include Jose Luis Ramírez, Rafael Limón, Rocky Lockridge, Meldrick Taylor, Roger Mayweather, Lonnie Smith, Sammy Fuentes, Héctor "Macho" Camacho, Juan Laporte, Edwin Rosario, Greg Haugen, Tony López, Giovanni Parisi, Joey Gamache and Frankie Randall, who had taken the WBC Light Welterweight belt from Chávez just four months earlier. He also lost to three champions: Frankie Randall, Oscar De La Hoya and Kostya Tszyu. He was held to a draw by two others: Pernell Whitaker and Miguel Ángel González.

Chávez retired in his 25th year as a professional boxer with a record of 107 wins, 6 losses and 2 draws, with 86 knockouts and is considered one of the greatest fighters of all time. He holds records for most successful consecutive defenses of world titles (27), most title fights (37), most title-fight victories (31) and he is after Joe Louis (with 23) for most title defenses won by knockout (21). His record was 89-0-1 going into his first loss to Frankie Randall and had an 87 fight win streak until his draw with Whitaker. He was ranked No. 50 on Ring Magazine's list of "100 greatest punchers of all time". As an in-fighter or "swarmer," Julio César Chávez was renowned specially for his devastating left hook and his extremely strong chin. Former heavyweight champion Mike Tyson, stated that Chávez was one of the greatest fighters of his generation and top five of all time from his point of view. Trainer Angelo Dundee said that Chávez had one of the strongest chins in boxing history. In 2002, The Ring'' ranked Chávez as the 18th greatest fighter of the last 80 years. On December 7, 2010, his induction to the International Boxing Hall of Fame was announced.

Professional boxing record

Exhibition boxing record

Pay-per-view bouts

See also

 List of WBA world champions
 List of WBC world champions
 List of IBF world champions
 List of lightweight boxing champions
 List of light welterweight boxing champions
 List of boxing triple champions
 Notable boxing families
 List of Mexican boxing world champions

References

External links

 

1962 births
Boxers from Sonora
International Boxing Federation champions
International Boxing Hall of Fame inductees
Living people
Mexican male boxers
People from Ciudad Obregón
People from Culiacán
Welterweight boxers
World Boxing Association champions
World Boxing Council champions
World super-featherweight boxing champions
World lightweight boxing champions
World light-welterweight boxing champions